Blind is a delayed Indian Hindi-language crime thriller film directed by Shome Makhija and produced by Sujoy Ghosh, Avishek Ghosh, Hyunwoo Thomas Kim, Sachin Nahar, Pinkesh Nahar and Manish W. The film features Sonam Kapoor in a lead role with Purab Kohli, Vinay Pathak and Lillete Dubey in supporting roles. Blind a remake of the 2011 Korean film of the same name, centres around a blind police officer in search of a serial killer. The principal photography began on 28 December 2020 in Glasgow, Scotland and wrapped up on 13 February 2021. The film is now premiere on ZEE5.

Cast
 Sonam Kapoor
 Purab Kohli
 Vinay Pathak
 Lillete Dubey
 Shubham Saraf
 Lucy Aarden

Production 
The Principal photography commenced on 28 December 2020 in Scotland. The film was wrapped up on 13 February 2021.

References

External links 
 
 

Upcoming Indian films
Upcoming Hindi-language films
Films shot in Mumbai
Films about blind people in India
Indian remakes of South Korean films
Indian crime thriller films
Police detective films
Films about blind people
Indian serial killer films
Films shot in Glasgow